is the 2nd EP or mini-album (fourth overall album release) by Mika Nakashima. This album was limited to only 111,000 copies. The title track, a duet with violinist Taro Hakase, later appears on her Music album. '' translates to "A Misty, Moon-lit Night: Prayer."

This mini-album, when it was released, reached #3 on the Oricon 200 Album Chart, selling 93,000 copies in its first week.

Track listing

Oricon sales charts (Japan)

References 

Mika Nakashima albums
2004 EPs
Japanese-language EPs